A by-election was held for the Australian House of Representatives seat of Darling Downs on 19 December 1936. This was triggered by the death of United Australia Party MP and former Speaker Sir Littleton Groom.

The by-election was won by Country Party candidate and future Prime Minister Arthur Fadden.

Results

References

1936 elections in Australia
Queensland federal by-elections
1930s in Queensland